Earthbound is a 1981 American science fiction comedy film directed by James L. Conway. It received limited theatrical release after being rejected as a television pilot.

Plot summary
When a family of benevolent humanoid aliens is stranded in the Midwestern United States after their spaceship crashes, a kind innkeeper (Burl Ives) and his grandson (Todd Porter) take them in. Once word gets out that aliens have landed, Sheriff De Rita (John Schuck) and Deputy Sweeney (Stuart Pankin) prove unable to handle the crowds. A government agent (Joseph Campanella) arrives,  who wants to assure that the aliens cannot intermingle with humankind.

Cast
 Burl Ives as Ned Anderson
 Todd Porter as Tommy Anderson
 Christopher Connelly as Zef
 Meredith MacRae as Lara
 Joseph Campanella as Conrad
 Marc Gilpin as Dalem
 Mindy Dow as Rosie
 Elissa Leeds as Teva
 Peter Isacksen as Willy
 John Schuck as Sheriff De Rita
 Joey Forman as Madden
 Stuart Pankin as Sweeney
 H.M. Wynant as Dave
 Doodles Weaver as Sterling
 Jesse Bennett as Gold Rush man #2
 Anne Lockhart as Mom 
 Cindy Bertagnolli as Unknown Extra
 Allen Tatomer as Extra, Local Posse, Townie
 Scottie Anderson as Extra, Local Posse, Townie

Production
Parts of the film were shot in Park City, Utah. The movie was developed as a TV pilot, and released theatrically when the networks showed no interest. John Schuck stated that while the area where the movie was shot was beautiful, the two-week production of the film was rushed and the script was lacking. He also felt the 16-mm filming did not lend itself to a theatrical release.

Reception

In Creature Feature, the movie received 2 out of 5 stars, finding the direction lacking. The show was cited as one that had potential, but was not picked up as a series in Starlog.

References

Citations

Sources

External links
 
 
 

1981 films
1981 comedy films
1981 independent films
1980s English-language films
1980s science fiction comedy films
American independent films
American science fiction comedy films
Films directed by James L. Conway
Films shot in Utah
Taft Entertainment Pictures films
Television pilots not picked up as a series
1980s American films